This article documents events, research findings, effects, and responses related to global warming and climate change during the year 2023.

Summaries

Measurements and statistics
 3 January: the National Snow and Ice Data Center reported that Antarctic sea ice extent stood at the lowest in the 45-year satellite record—more than 500,000 square kilometers (193,000 square miles) below the previous record (2018), with four of the five lowest years for the last half of December having occurred since 2016.
 26 January: Bloomberg NEF's "Energy Transition Investment Trends" report estimated that, for the first time, energy transition investment matched global fossil fuel investment—$1.1 trillion in 2022, including China with $546 billion, the US with $141 billion, and the EU if treated as a bloc, $180 billion.

Natural events and phenomena
 7 February: a study published in Nature Communications concluded that 15 million people globally are exposed to impacts from potential glacial lake outburst floods (GLOFs), more than half being from India, Pakistan, Peru, and China. Climate change has intensified glacial ice melt and expanded glacial lakes.
 13 February: a study published in the Proceedings of the National Academy of Sciences reported that increasing abundance of a thermotolerant symbiotic alga hosted by corals has facilitated maintenance of high coral cover after three mass coral bleaching events, suggesting that future reefs might maintain high cover for several decades, albeit with low diversity and provided that other stressors are minimized.
 2 March: a study published in Science said that boreal fires, typically accounting for 10% of global fire  emissions, contributed 23% in 2021, by far the highest fraction since 2000. 2021 was an abnormal year because North American and Eurasian boreal forests synchronously experienced their greatest water deficit.
 13 March: a study published in Nature Water found that total intensity of extreme events (droughts and pluvials (rainfall events)) is strongly correlated with global mean temperature, and concluded that continued warming of the planet will cause more frequent, more severe, longer and/or larger of such extreme events, and that "distortion of the water cycle... will be among the most conspicuous consequences of climate change".

Actions, and goal statements

Science and technology
Progress in climate change mitigation implementation research:
5 January: A paywalled meta-analysis in Nature Climate Change reports "required technology-level investment shifts for climate-relevant infrastructure until 2035" within the EU, which it finds to be "most drastic for power plants, electricity grids and rail infrastructure", ~87€ billion above the planned budgets and in need of sustainable finance policies.
12 January: A study in Environmental Research Letters suggests that applying the principle of extended producer responsibility to fossil fuels could deconflict energy security and climate policy at an affordable cost, in particular authors suggest the responsibility could be used to establish the financing of  storage and nature-based solutions.
30 January: A study in Nature Sustainability outlines a plan for aviation decarbonization by 2050 with moderate demand growth, continuous efficiency improvements, new short-haul engines, higher SAF production and CO2 removal to compensate for non-CO2 forcing. With constant air transport demand and aircraft efficiency, decarbonizing aviation would require nearly five times the 2019 worldwide biofuel production, competing with other hard-to-decarbonize sectors, and 0.2 to 3.4 Gt of CO2 removal to compensate for non-CO2 forcing. Carbon offsets would be preferred if carbon credits are less expensive than SAFs, but they may be unreliable, while specific routing could avoid contrails. As of 2023, fuel represents 20-30% of the airlines’ operating costs, while SAF is 2–4 times more expensive than fossil jet fuel. Projected cost decreases of green hydrogen and carbon capture could make synthetic fuels more affordable, and lower feedstock costs and higher conversion efficiencies would help FT and HEFA biofuels. Policy incentives like cleaner aviation fuel tax credits and low-carbon fuel standards could induce improvements, and carbon pricing could render SAFs more competitive, accelerating their deployment and reducing their costs through learning and economies of scale.

Political, economic, legal, and cultural actions
 1 January: Extinction Rebellion made a statement that for 2023 it had made "a controversial resolution to temporarily shift away from public disruption as a primary tactic", after 2022's traffic blockages and throwing soup on the case of Vincent van Gogh’s "Sunflowers" painting.
 11 January: the French National Assembly adopted the Acceleration of Renewable Energies bill, which includes a requirement to install solar panels on all car parks (parking lots) of over 1,500 square metres (16,100 square feet).
 14 February: the European Parliament effectively banned sale of new petrol and diesel cars in the European Union from 2035, and set a 55% cut over 2021  emission levels for new cars sold from 2030.
 March: the UN 2023 Water Conference is scheduled to be held in New York.
 November: the 2023 United Nations Climate Change Conference is scheduled to be held in Dubai.

Mitigation goal statements

Adaptation goal statements

Consensus

Projections

 2 January: a study published in Earth's Future (American Geophysical Union) concluded that the greatest increase in the amount of coastal area below mean sea level will occur in the early stages of sea level rise (SLR), contrary to earlier assessments, shortening time for adaptation efforts.
 5 January: a study published in Science stated that, based on then-current pledges, global mean temperature is projected to increase by +2.7 °C, which would cause loss of about half of Earth's glaciers by 2100, causing a sea level rise of 115±40 millimeters (not counting ice sheet melt).
 30 January: Climate scientists predict, using artificial intelligence, in Proceedings of the National Academy of Sciences that global warming will exceed 1.5 °C  (scenario SSP2-4.5), and a nearly 70% chance of 2 °C between 2044 and 2065 (~2054) – a substantial probability of exceeding the 2 °C threshold – even if emissions rapidly decline (scenario SSP1-2.6).
 February: the International Energy Agency's Electricity Market Report 2023 projected that low-emissions sources will constitute almost all the growth in global electricity demand through 2025, with renewables' portion of global power generation rising from 29% in 2022 to 35% in 2025.
 13 March: a study published in Nature Sustainability forecast that floating photovoltaic (FPV) systems on reservoirs could provide 9,434±29 terawatt-hours/year—over a third of global electricity.

Significant publications
 February:

See also

 2023 in science
 Climatology § History
 History of climate change policy and politics
 History of climate change science
 Politics of climate change § History
 Timeline of sustainable energy research 2020–present

References

External links

Organizations
 The Intergovernmental Panel on Climate Change (IPCC)
 World Meteorological Organization (WMO)
 Climate indicators at the U.S. Environmental Protection Agency

Surveys, summaries and report lists

2023 in science
Climate change
History of climate variability and change
Global environmental issues
2023 in the environment